Charlie Shackleton (formerly Charlie Lyne, born 15 August 1991) is a British filmmaker, multimedia artist, and film critic. He has made several films, including Beyond Clueless, Fear Itself and the 2016 protest film Paint Drying as well as the multimedia performance piece As Mine Exactly.

Early life 
Charlie Shackleton was born in 15 August 1991 at St Mary's Hospital in London, raised by his mother, Jane Shackleton. He details in his film As Mine Exactly how their relationship evolved after she developed epilepsy when he was a child. Shackleton at the time videotaped several of her seizures at the request of her medical team.

Career 
Shackleton established the movie blog Ultra Culture in 2008, at the age of 16. In 2010, Shackleton joined the BBC programme Film 2010, after being approached by host Claudia Winkleman on Twitter. Shackleton left the show after one season. He continues to write film criticism as a regular contributor to Sight & Sound.

His debut film Beyond Clueless premiered at SXSW in 2014. The film, an essayistic exploration of nineties teen movies narrated by Fairuza Balk, was crowdfunded through Kickstarter. His second, Fear Itself, debuted on the BBC iPlayer in October 2015. Like his debut, it utilised existing film footage and original narration, this time exploring the horror genre.

In 2016, Shackleton again took to Kickstarter to crowdfund a 607-minute film of white paint drying on a brick wall to be submitted to the British Board of Film Classification in a protest against censorship and mandatory classification for films released in the UK. On 26 January 2016, Paint Drying was given a U rating for 'no material likely to offend or harm'. In 2018 he founded the production company LOOP with filmmakers Antony Ing and Catherine Bray. The same year they offered three ‘no-strings-attached’ filmmaker grants of £5,000, which were awarded to Jamie Janković, Grace Lee, and John Ogunmuyiwa. Loop will not retain any copyright or ownership of the films.

Through Loop, Shackleton continued to direct and produce features and shorts in the essay film format. His short documentaries Fish Story and Lasting Marks, published through The Guardian, focussed on the family history of film critic Caspar Salmon and the British police's investigation into same-sex male sadomasochism in the 1980s, respectively. Lasting Marks was a co-production with documentarian Laura Poitras's company Field of Vision, and based on Shackleton's own archival research. He worked with Ross Sutherland on the essay film Stand By for Tape Back-Up, which used the degrading quality of VHS tapes to explore familial grief, and was a creative consultant on Kitty Green's The Assistant.
In 2021 and 2022 respectively he began touring two new projects: The Afterlight, another essay film which exists as a single print which will degrade with each showing, and As Mine Exactly, a virtual reality performance piece about his mother’s experiences with epilepsy. Both works can only be accessed in person; As Mine Exactly is performed one-on-one by Shackleton for each individual. As Mine Exactly was performed in Belfast; Denver; Columbus; New York City; London; Lewisburg, PA; and Columbia, MO for between 20 and 52 individuals in each city. The piece won the Immersive Art and XR Award at the 2022 London Film Festival.

Personal life 
According to Shackleton, he and his mother were abandoned by his father when he was a baby. He started using his father's surname, Lyne, around 2004 in what he termed "a fit of teenage reinvention". In 2019, regretting the decision, he resumed using his mother's last name.

Works

Film 
Beyond Clueless (2014)
Copy Cat (2015)
Fear Itself (2015)
Paint Drying (2016)
Fish Story (2017)
Personal Truth (2017)
Lasting Marks (2018)
A Machine For Viewing (2019)
The Afterlight (2021)

Multimedia 

 As Mine Exactly (2022)

References

External links 

English film critics
English television presenters
British bloggers
1991 births
Living people
English filmmakers
Multimedia artists
Collage filmmakers